The 2021–22 season was the 122nd season in the existence of S.S. Lazio and the club's 34th consecutive season in the top flight of Italian football. In addition to the domestic league, Lazio participated in this season's editions of the Coppa Italia and the UEFA Europa League.

Players

First-team squad

Other players under contract

Transfers

In

Out

Pre-season and friendlies

Competitions

Overall record

Serie A

League table

Results summary

Results by round

Matches
The league fixtures were announced on 14 July 2021.

Coppa Italia

UEFA Europa League

Group stage

The draw for the group stage was held on 27 August 2021.

Knockout phase

Knockout round play-offs
The knockout round play-offs draw was held on 13 December 2021.

Statistics

Appearances and goals

|-
! colspan=14 style="background:#B2FFFF; text-align:center"| Goalkeepers

|-
! colspan=14 style="background:#B2FFFF; text-align:center"| Defenders

|-
! colspan=14 style="background:#B2FFFF; text-align:center"| Midfielders

|-
! colspan=14 style="background:#B2FFFF; text-align:center"| Forwards

|-
! colspan=14 style="background:#B2FFFF; text-align:center"| Players transferred out during the season

Goalscorers

References

S.S. Lazio seasons
Lazio
2021–22 UEFA Europa League participants seasons